Goniurosaurus toyamai, also called commonly the Iheja ground gecko, the Iheyajima leopard gecko, and Toyama's ground gecko, is a species of lizard in the family Eublepharidae. The species is endemic to the island of Iheyajima in the Ryukyu Islands (Japan).

Etymology
The specific name, toyamai, is in honor of Japanese herpetologist MasanaoToyama.

Habitat
The preferred natural habitat of G. toyamai is forest.

Reproduction
G. toyamai is oviparous.

References

Further reading
Dickhoff A (2004). "Ein Tiger im Terrarium – Haltung und Nachzucht von Goniurosaurus araneus (GRISMER, VIETS & BOYLE 1999)". Draco 5: 76–81. (Goniurosaurus toyamai, new status). (in German).
, Ota H, Tanaka S (1994). "Phylogeny, Classification, and Biogeography of Goniurosaurus kuroiwae (Squamata: Eublepharidae) from the Ryukyu Archipelago, Japan, with Description of a New Subspecies". Zoological Science, Tokyo 11: 319–335. (Goniurosaurus kuroiwae toyamai, new subspecies, pp. 328–330, Figure 7).

Goniurosaurus
Endemic reptiles of Japan
Endemic fauna of the Ryukyu Islands
Reptiles described in 1994
Taxa named by Larry Lee Grismer